is a private university in Ebetsu, Hokkaido, Japan, established in 1960. Its name, refers to the university's predecessor, a public school teaching dairy farming that was founded in 1933. Its specializations remain agriculture and veterinary medicine to this day.  means simply "school" (of any level), being part of its former names.

External links
 Official website 

Educational institutions established in 1933
Private universities and colleges in Japan
Universities and colleges in Hokkaido
1933 establishments in Japan
Christian universities and colleges in Japan